This article contains a list of organs of the human body. A general consensus is widely believed to be 78 organs; however, there is no universally standard definition of what constitutes an organ, and some tissue groups' status as one is debated. Since there is no single standard definition of what an organ is, the number of organs varies depending on how one defines an organ. For example, this list contains much more than 78 different organs.

Musculoskeletal system

Human skeleton
Joints 
Ligaments
Muscular system 
Tendons

Digestive system

Mouth
Teeth
Tongue
Lips
Salivary glands
Parotid glands
Submandibular glands
Sublingual glands
Pharynx
Esophagus
Stomach
Small intestine
Duodenum
Jejunum
Ileum
Large intestine
Cecum
Ascending colon
Transverse colon
Descending colon
Sigmoid colon
Rectum
Liver
Gallbladder
Mesentery
Pancreas
Anal canal

Respiratory system

Nasal cavity
Pharynx
Larynx
Trachea
Bronchi
Bronchioles and smaller air passages
Lungs
Muscles of breathing

Urinary system

Kidneys
Ureter
Bladder
Urethra

Reproductive systems

Female reproductive system

Internal reproductive organs
Ovaries
Fallopian tubes
Uterus
Cervix
Placenta

External reproductive organs
Vulva
Clitoris
Vagina

Male reproductive system

Internal reproductive organs
Testes
Epididymis
Vas deferens
Seminal vesicles
Prostate
Bulbourethral glands
External reproductive organs
Penis
Scrotum

Endocrine system

Pituitary gland
Pineal gland
Thyroid gland
Parathyroid glands
Adrenal glands
Pancreas

Circulatory system

Circulatory system

Heart
Arteries
Veins
Capillaries

Lymphatic system

Lymphatic vessel
Lymph node
Bone marrow
Thymus
Spleen
Gut-associated lymphoid tissue
Tonsils
Interstitium

Nervous system

Brain
Cerebrum
Cerebral hemispheres
Diencephalon or interbrain
Thalamus
Hypothalamus
Midbrain
Cerebellum
Pons
Medulla oblongata
The spinal cord
The ventricular system
Choroid plexus

Peripheral nervous system

Nerves
Cranial nerves
Spinal nerves
Ganglia
Enteric nervous system

Sensory organs
Eye
Cornea
Iris
Ciliary body
Lens
Retina
Ear
Outer ear
Earlobe
Eardrum
Middle ear
Ossicles
Inner ear
Cochlea
Vestibule of the ear
Semicircular canals
Olfactory epithelium
Tongue
Taste buds

Integumentary system

Mammary glands
Skin
Subcutaneous tissue

See also

 Terminologia Anatomica
 List of systems of the human body
 List of distinct cell types in the adult human body

References

Human anatomy by organ
Lists of human anatomical features